Frizzled-7 (Fd-7) is a protein that in humans is encoded by the FZD7 gene.

Members of the 'frizzled' gene family encode 7-transmembrane domain proteins that are receptors for Wnt signaling proteins.  The FZD7 protein contains an N-terminal signal sequence, 10 cysteine residues typical of the cysteine-rich extracellular domain of Fz family members, 7 putative transmembrane domains, and an intracellular C-terminal tail with a PDZ domain-binding motif.  FZD7 gene expression may downregulate APC function and enhance beta-catenin-mediated signals in poorly differentiated human esophageal carcinomas.

Interactions
Fz-7 has been shown to interact with DLG4.

References

Further reading

External links

G protein-coupled receptors